Dipaenae eucera is a moth of the subfamily Arctiinae first described by Felder in 1875. It is found in Colombia.

References

Lithosiini